Melia or Melie (Ancient Greek: Μελία, Μελίη) may refer to:

Greek mythology
 Melia (mythology), the name of several figures
 Melia, the singular form of Meliae, a type of nymph

People and fictional characters
 Melia (given name)
 Melia (surname)

Hotels
 Hotel Meliá, a hotel in Ponce, Puerto Rico
 Meliá Hotels International, a Spanish-owned hotel chain

Flora and fauna
 Melia (plant), a genus of trees
 Melia, a former genus of snout moths now synonymized with Aphomia
 Melia, a Hawaiian name for the Plumeria (frangipani) flower

Other uses
 Melia, Evros, a village in northeastern Greece

See also
 Melia's Grocers and Tea Dealers, a 20th-century grocery store chain
 Mi'ilya, an Arab local council in the western Galilee, Israel
 Mellia (disambiguation)

it:Scilla (Italia)#Frazioni